Kuusemäe is a village in Anija Parish, Harju County in northern Estonia. Kuusemäe has a population of 17 (as of 1 January 2010).

References

Villages in Harju County